SPSS Inc. was a software house headquartered in Chicago and incorporated in Delaware, most noted for the proprietary software of the same name SPSS. The company was started in 1968 when Norman Nie, Dale Bent, and Hadlai "Tex" Hull developed and started selling the SPSS software. The company was incorporated in 1975, and Nie served as CEO from 1975 until 1992. Jack Noonan served as CEO from 1992 until the 2009 acquisition of SPSS Inc. by IBM.

In addition to the software which shares its name, SPSS Inc. sold a wide range of software for market research, survey research and statistical analysis. These included AMOS (Before 2003, it was part of SmallWaters Corp.) for structural equation modeling, SamplePower for statistical power analysis, AnswerTree (decision tree software) used for market segmentation, SPSS Text Analysis for Surveys to code open-ended responses, Quantum for cross-tabulation, SPSS Modeler (previously known as Clementine or PASW Modeler) for data mining and mrInterview for CATI and online surveys.

SPSS had forged partnerships with several other high-profile companies such as Oracle Corporation and participates in a number of US government programs.
The company was challenged legally of artificially inflating their stock price in 2004.

IBM acquisition
In January 2010, the company became "SPSS: An IBM Company". Complete transfer of business to IBM was done by October 1, 2010. By that date, SPSS: An IBM Company ceased to exist. IBM SPSS is now fully integrated into the IBM Corporation, and is one of two brands under IBM Software Group's Business Analytics Portfolio.

References

External links
IBM SPSS Homepage
Stock Market Commentary
Wall Street Journal article about IBM acquisition of SPSS, Inc.
History of SPSS Inc. from 1968 to 2003.

Software companies based in Illinois
Companies based in Chicago
IBM acquisitions
Former IBM subsidiaries
2009 mergers and acquisitions
Software companies established in 1968
1968 establishments in Illinois
Defunct software companies of the United States